The discography of The Wolfe Tones, an Irish folk and rebel group from the suburbs of Dublin, consists of sixteen studio albums, three extended plays, three live albums and ten compilation albums. The Wolfe Tones released their first album with Fontana Records in 1965 and released their most recent studio album with Shanachie Records in 2004. In the interim, the band has also released albums with Dolphin Records, Triskel Records and MCA.

During over fifty years of producing music, the Wolfe Tones have enjoyed substantial success in Ireland and the United States, where they continue to tour annually.  Their most famous song is "A Nation Once Again", which was voted the number one song of all time by a 2002 BBC World Service vote. The Wolfe Tones are also well known for "Celtic Symphony", a 1987 musical tribute to the centennial of Celtic Football Club, and "Joe McDonnell", a song that chronicled the 1981 Hunger Strike in Northern Ireland.

In early 2020 their single Come Out, Ye Black and Tans regained prominence in the Official Charts of Ireland and the UK, due to political controversy surrounding a planned commemoration of the Royal Irish Constabulary.

Albums

Studio albums

Live albums

Compilation albums

Extended plays

Singles

References

Discographies of Irish artists